The Ski Association of Slovenia is an organization devoted to skiing in Slovenia. Headquartered in Ljubljana, it is the national representative of the International Ski Federation.

Founded in 1948, it covers the skiing disciplines of alpine, cross-country, Nordic combined, ski jumping, and snowboarding.

The current president is Enzo Smrekar.

List of presidents

References
Official website 

Slovenia
Ski
1948 establishments in Yugoslavia
Skiing organizations